Mangalampalli Balamuralikrishna (6 July 1930 – 22 November 2016) was an Indian Carnatic vocalist, musician, multi-instrumentalist, playback singer, composer, and character actor. He was awarded the Madras Music Academy's Sangeetha Kalanidhi in 1978. He has garnered two National Film Awards (1976, 1987), the Sangeet Natak Akademi Award in 1975, the Padma Vibhushan, India's second-highest civilian honor in 1991, for his contribution towards arts, the Mahatma Gandhi Silver Medal from UNESCO in 1995, the Chevalier of the Ordre des Arts et des Lettres by the French Government in 2005, the Sangeetha Kalanidhi by Madras Music Academy, and the Sangeetha Kalasikhamani in 1991, by the Fine Arts Society, Chennai to name a few.

Balamuralikrishna started his career at the age of six. In his life-time, he gave over 25,000 concerts worldwide. Apart from Pandit Bhimsen Joshi, he presented jugalbandi concerts (duets) with Pandit Hariprasad Chaurasia, Pandit Ajoy Chakrabarty and Kishori Amonkar, among others. He is also known for popularizing the compositions of Sri Bhadrachala Ramadasu, Sri Annamacharya, and others.

Balamuralikrishna's concerts combined sophisticated vocal skills and rhythmic patterns of classical music with the popular demand for entertainment value. Balamuralikrishna presented concerts in many countries, including the US, Canada, UK, Italy, France, Russia, Sri Lanka, Malaysia, Singapore, countries in the Middle East, and elsewhere. Apart from his native tongue, Telugu, he has also composed in other languages including Kannada, Sanskrit, Tamil, Malayalam, Hindi, Bengali, and Punjabi.

He appeared as a featured soloist with an award-winning British choir, performing the "Gitanjali Suite" with words from Rabindranath Tagore's Nobel Prize-winning poetry and music by "Dr. Joel", the noted UK-based Goan composer. His clear diction in several languages prompted an invitation to record Tagore's entire Rabindra Sangeet compositions in Bengali, preserving them for posterity. He had sung in French, and even ventured into jazz fusion, collaborating with the top Carnatic percussion teacher, Sri T.H. Subash Chandran, in a concert for Malaysian royalty.

Early life

Balamuralikrishna was born in a Brahmin family at Sankaraguptam, East Godavari District, Madras Presidency (now a part of Andhra Pradesh state). His father, Mangalampalli Pattabhiramayya, was a well known musician and his mother, Suryakanthamma, was a veena player. Balamuralikrishna's mother died when he was an infant and he was raised by his father. Observing his interest in music, his father put him under the tutelage of Parupalli Ramakrishnayya Pantulu, a direct descendant of the shishya parampara (lineage of disciples) of Tyagaraja. Under his guidance, the young Balamuralikrishna learned Carnatic music. At the age of eight, he gave his first full-fledged concert at a Thyagaraja Aradhana in Vijayawada. Musunuri Suryanarayana Murty Bhagavatar, a Harikatha performer, saw the musical talent in him and gave the prefix "Bala" (lit. child) to the young Balamuralikrishna. (Prior to this, his name was Muralikrishna; following Bhagavatar's addition of the prefix, he began to be known as Balamuralikrishna.)

Having begun his musical career at a very young age, by age fifteen he had mastered all the 72 melakartha ragas and had composed krithis in each of them. His Janaka Raga Manjari was published in 1952 and recorded as Raagaanga Ravali in a nine-volume series by the Sangeeta Recording Company. Not merely content with his fame as a Carnatic vocalist, he also played the kanjira, mridangam, viola, and violin. He accompanied various musicians on the violin. He also presented solo viola concerts. He was the person who introduced viola to classical Indian music.

Experimentation

Characteristic of Balamuralikrishna's musical journey have been his non-conformism, spirit of experimentation, and boundless creativity. Balamuralikrishna has experimented with the Carnatic music system by keeping its rich tradition untouched. Ragas such as Ganapathi, Sarvashri, Mahati, Lavangi etc. are credited to him. The ragas which he invented represent his quest for new frontiers. Ragas such as Lavangi are set to three or four notes in ascending and descending scale. Ragas such as Mahathi, Lavangi, Sidhdhi, Sumukham that he created have only four notes; while his other ragaa creations such as Sarva Sri, Omkaari, and Ganapathy have only three notes.

He also innovated in the tala (rhythm) system. He has incorporated "gati bhEdam" (గతి భేదం) in the "sashabda kriya" (సశబ్ద క్రియ). Actions that can produce sound/shabda (శబ్ద) in talas are called sashabda kriya – సశబ్ద క్రియ and are a part of the existing Tala chain. New chains are possible, too. Saint Arunagirinaadhar used to inject such systems in his famous Thirupugazh, but only as Sandham, while Balamuralikrishna is known to be the pioneer in bringing such Sandhams into a logical rhythm, with Angam and definition. Trimukhi, Panchamukhi, Saptamukhi, and Navamukhi are the basic classifications in his New Tala System.

He gave his authorisation to S. Ram Bharati to found "Academy of Performing Arts and Research" in Switzerland. He also worked on music therapy. After his death, his family started a trust in his name 'Dr.M.Balamuralikrishna Memorial Trust' to honor and keep his legacy alive. He has authored a musical therapy research paper with Shreya Kappagantula regarding "The Effects of Musical Therapy on Mental Disorders"

Compositions
Balamuralikrishna has over 400 compositions to his credit and is one of the very few people to have composed in all the 72 Melakarta Ragas and has created several ragas, with 4 notes and 3 notes and also has invented a new Tala system. His compositions encompass every genre in Carnatic Music including Varnas, Krithis, Thillanas, Bhavageethas.

Cinema

Balamuralikrishna has sung in several films in Telugu, Sanskrit, Malayalam, Kannada and Tamil. He made his acting debut with the Telugu film Bhakta Prahlada (1967) as Narada, and has acted in a few other films in Telugu, Tamil and malayalam.

Death

Balamuralikrishna died at his residence in Chennai on 22 November 2016; he was 86. He died in deep sleep at around five in the evening, due to a cardiac arrest. He was cremated with full state honours at Besant Nagar Crematorium in Chennai the very next day. Thousands attended his funeral. He is surrounded by three daughters and three sons who are all Doctors. His wife, Smt. Annapurna, outlived him for three months, and died on 16 February 2017.

Legacy
His family has formed the Dr. M. Balamurali Krishna Memorial Trust to represent him after his death.

Awards and honours

Civilian honours
 Padma Shri (1971)
 Padma Bhushan

 Padma Vibhushan (1991)
 Chevalier of the Ordre des Arts et des Lettres from the Government of France (2005)

National Film Awards (India)
 Best Male Playback Singer for the Kannada musical movie Hamsageethe (1975)
 Best Music Direction for the Kannada film Madhvacharya (1986)

Kerala State Film Award
 Best singer for Swathi Thirunal (1987)
 Best Classical Music Singer for Gramam (2010)

Tamil Nadu State Film Award
 Tamil Nadu State Film Award for Best Male Playback singer for Pasanga (2009)

Other honours
 Sangeet Natak Akademi Award (1975)
 Sangeetha Kalanidhi by Madras Music Academy (1978)
 Raja-Lakshmi Award in 1980 by Sri Raja-Lakshmi Foundation in Chennai
 Doctor of Letters from Shri Venkateshwara University (1981)
 Honorary PhD from Andhra University
 Doctor of Science from Andhra University
 Doctor of Letters from Andhra University
 Sangeetha Kalasikhamani by The Fine Arts Society, Chennai (1991)
 Mahatma Gandhi Silver Medal from UNESCO (1995)
 Natya Kalasikhamani The Fine Arts Society, Chennai (2001)
 Sangeetha Kalasarathy (2002)
 "Sangeetha Virinchi" title conferred by Sangeetha Bharathi music School, Auckland, New Zealand (2009)
 Lifetime Achievement Award by the Global Indian Music Academy Awards (2011)
 First Citizen Award from Vijayawada City
 "Wisdom Man of the Year" (1992)
 "Naada Maharishi" by the Nrityalaya Aesthetics Society (1996)
A documentary film, The Melody Man, was made on his life by the Government of India Films Division. The film was directed by National award winner Director Gul Bahar Singh.
 Telugu Book of Records honoured him for Telugu Legendary Personality in 2014 at Vijayawada

Ragas created

Talas created

The 'Mukhi' Tala system builds on the traditional Adhi Tala or Chathusra Jaathi Triputa Tala ( I 0 0 ), however the first kriya or mukha (meaning face) of each anga takes the gathi of its tala name and the rest in chathusra gathi. For example: Panchamukhi – the first kriya of each anga will be in kanda gathi and so the tala consists of 35 Matras (5 + 4 + 4 + 4 | 5 + 4 | 5 + 4 || ).

Following this method, four Talas can be generated:

This scheme can be extended across all 35 sooladi thalas, however currently these four are in practice.

Compositions:

There have been many pallavis set to panchamukhi Tala such as 'Isai inbathirku ēdillaye ivulakil – sentamil' in ragam Lathangi composed by Amrutha Venkatesh and 'Aadi Vaa, Pirai Soodi Vaa, Aalavaai Naathane''' in ragam Abheri composed by Rameshvaidya and tuned by S.J Jananiy and also others in Bilahari, Thodi and Kalyani composed by Dr. Balamuralikrishna himself.

There have also been Alarippus composed for Bharathanatyam in Panchamukhi.

Selected compositions

Albums and songs 
Balamuralikrishna has composed songs few albums and has sung, list of albums and songs below

Film compositions
Balamuralikrishna acted in few films and gave his voice to some selected songs in Indian cinema.

References

Further reading

External links

 Murali and Me: A tribute by Prince Aswathi Thirunal Rama Varma.
 Balamuralikrishna with his musicians in Switzerland in 1992.
 Various devotional works of Balamuralikrishna.

1930 births
2016 deaths
Male Carnatic singers
Carnatic singers
Chevaliers of the Ordre des Arts et des Lettres
Kanjira players
Violists
Kerala State Film Award winners
Recipients of the Padma Shri in arts
Recipients of the Padma Vibhushan in arts
Recipients of the Sangeet Natak Akademi Award
Recipients of the Sangeet Natak Akademi Fellowship
Sangeetha Kalanidhi recipients
Best Music Direction National Film Award winners
Indian male playback singers
Tamil playback singers
Telugu playback singers
Kannada playback singers
People from East Godavari district
Indian multi-instrumentalists
People from Krishna district
Film musicians from Andhra Pradesh
Singers from Andhra Pradesh
20th-century Indian male singers
20th-century Indian singers
21st-century Indian male singers
21st-century Indian singers
Best Male Playback Singer National Film Award winners
Carnatic composers
Sanskrit-language singers
20th-century violists
21st-century violists